The Swedish Ski Team is the national skiing sport team of Sweden.

Alpine skiing

Men
 André Myhrer – Slalom, Giant Slalom, combined
 Anton Lahdenperä – Slalom, Giant Slalom, combined
 Jens Byggmark - Slalom, Giant Slalom, combined
 Johan Brolenius - Slalom, Giant Slalom, combined
 Markus Larsson - Slalom, Giant Slalom, combined
 Mattias Hargin - Slalom, Giant Slalom, combined
 Matts Olsson - Slalom, Giant Slalom, combined, Super G, downhill
 Hans Olsson - Super G, downhill
 Niklas Rainer - Giant Slalom, Super G, downhill, combined
 Patrik Järbyn - Super G, downhill, combined
 Oscar Andersson - Giant Slalom, Super G

Women
Anja Pärsson - Slalom, Giant Slalom, Super G, Downhill, combined
Frida Hansdotter - Slalom, Giant Slalom, Super G, Downhill, combined
Jessica Lindell-Vikarby - Super G, Downhill, combined
Kajsa Kling - Slalom, Giant Slalom, Super G, Downhill combined
Nike Bent - Super G, Downhill, combined
Veronica Smedh - Slalom, Giant Slalom, combined
Therese Borssén - Slalom, Giant Slalom, combined
Maria Pietilä Holmner - Slalom, Giant Slalom, combined
Magdalena Fjällström

Cross-country skiing

Sprint

Men

Björn Lind
Emil Jönsson
Thobias Fredriksson
Peter Larsson
Robin Bryntesson
Marcus Hellner
Fredrik Byström

Women

Charlotte Kalla
Lina Andersson
Anna Olsson
Ida Ingemarsdotter
Britta Norgren

Classic and skate skiing, 5 km or longer

Men

Johan Olsson
Marcus Hellner
Anders Södergren
Mattias Fredriksson
Daniel Richardsson
Jesper Modin
Mats Larsson
Tilo Soderhjelm

Women

Charlotte Kalla
Anna Haag
Anna Olsson
Anna Simberg
Britta Norgren
Maria Rydqvist
Sara Lindborg
Ida Ingemarsdotter

Ski jumping

Men

Johan Erikson
Andreas Aren
Carl Nordin
Isak Grimholm
Fredrik Baalkaasen
Niklas Eriksson

Ski jumping in Sweden
Alpine skiing in Sweden
Ski
Skiing in Sweden